The 22nd Infantry Division (Ready Reserve), Philippine Army, known as the Eagle Division, is one of the Army Reserve Command's ready reserve infantry divisions.

The unit specializes in Urban Warfare, Urban Search and Rescue, Humanitarian Assistance and Disaster Relief, and Civil-Military Operations. It operates mostly in the Davao Region (Region 11), Sarangani, and South Cotabato Provinces.

Organization
The following are the Base/Brigade units that are under the 22nd Infantry Division (RR).

Base Units
  Headquarters & Headquarters Service Battalion (HHSBn)
  Service Support Battalion (SSBn)
  Military Police Company (MP Coy)
 Engineering Combat Battalion (ECBn)
  Reconnaissance Battalion (Recon Bn)
  Military Intelligence Battalion (MIBn)

Line Units
  2201st Infantry Brigade (Ready Reserve)
   2202nd Infantry Brigade (Ready Reserve)
  2203rd Infantry Brigade (Ready Reserve)

Notable Officers
 COL Sara Duterte-Carpio GSC (RES) PA - Current Mayor and former Vice-mayor of Davao City[14][15], current Deputy Brigade Commander of the 2202nd Infantry Brigade.
 COL ISIDRO T UNGAB GSC (RES) PA - congressman of third congressional district of Davao City and current brigade commander of the Division's 2202nd Ready Reserve Infantry Brigade and former Battalion Commander of the 3rd Metro Davao Infantry “Maasahan” Battalion, 2202Bde.
 COL Emmanuel "Manny" D.Pacquiao (RES) PA  - congressman of Sarangani's lone district and currently the commanding officer of the Division's 2203rd Infantry Brigade.
 LTC Allan L. Rellon (RES) PA - current mayor of Tagum City and battalion commander of the Division's 1st Davao Del Norte Infantry Battalion (Ready Reserve), 2201st Brigade

See also
 Army Reserve Command
 15th Infantry Division (Ready Reserve)
 AFP EASTMINCOM

References
Citations

Bibliography
 The Public Affairs Office, Philippine Army: The first 100 years, 1998, Philippine Army.
 The Training Committee, Basic Citizens Military Training Manual, 2009, HARESCOM.

Infantry divisions of the Philippines
Reserve and Auxiliary Units of the Philippine Military